Allen Player (5 September 1893 – 17 November 1962) was a New Zealand cricketer. He played 27 first-class matches for Auckland between 1919 and 1929.

See also
 List of Auckland representative cricketers

References

External links
 

1893 births
1962 deaths
New Zealand cricketers
Auckland cricketers
Cricketers from Auckland